Lautertal is a municipality in the Vogelsbergkreis in Hesse, Germany.

Geography

Location
Lautertal lies from 400 to 700 m above sea level in the High Vogelsberg Nature Park (Naturpark Hoher Vogelsberg). Lautertal is famous for the spectacular natural monument Felsenmeer. It is the product of geological processes that began about 340 million years ago. At that time two continents drifted towards each other and collided in the area of today's Odenwald. At this "junction" a huge mountain range was formed. At great depth the rock melted and rose as liquid magma. About 330 million years ago it cooled in the "core" of the piled up mountains to a rock similar to granite, the melaquarz diorite.

Neighbouring communities
Lautertal borders in the north on the community of Schwalmtal, in the east on the town of Lauterbach, in the south on the town of Herbstein, and in the west on the town of Ulrichstein and the community of Feldatal.

Constituent communities
The community of Lautertal consists of seven centres:
 Dirlammen
 Eichelhain
 Eichenrod
 Engelrod
 Hörgenau (administrative seat)
 Hopfmannsfeld
 Meiches

Politics

Municipal council

As of municipal elections held on 26 March 2006 the seats are apportioned thus:
 CDU 7 seats
 SPD 7 seats
 UBG (citizens' coalition) 1 seat

References

External links
Informations about German Felsenmeer in Lautertal(in German). October 2020.

Vogelsbergkreis
Grand Duchy of Hesse